Milford Laurenson "Curly" Page (8 May 1902 – 13 February 1987) was a New Zealand Test cricketer and rugby union player, who represented his country in both sports.

Early life and family
Born in Lyttelton on 8 May 1902, Page was the son of Olga Marguerite Smith and her husband, David Joseph Page, a produce and coal merchant. He was educated at Christchurch Boys' High School where he was a champion all-round sportsman.

Page had one sister and two brothers, including Frederick Page who was a professor of music, pianist and music critic.

Cricket
In a first-class career extending from 1920–21 to 1942–43, Page was New Zealand's second Test captain, and captained the side in seven of the Tests in which he played. He toured England in 1927, 1931 and 1937, and was captain of the team on the latter tour. He was the only player to appear in all 14 of New Zealand's Test matches before World War II.

He usually batted at number four or five, bowled useful slow-medium, and according to Dick Brittenden, his "slip fielding was magnificent, sometimes incredibly swift". His highest first-class score was 206, for Canterbury against Wellington in 1931–32, when he added 278 for the fourth wicket with Alby Roberts in the second innings after Canterbury had trailed by 277.

In the First Test at Lord's in 1931 he made 104 after New Zealand had trailed by 230 on the first innings. He added 118 for the third wicket with Stewie Dempster, then Page and Roger Blunt added 142 in 105 minutes for the fourth wicket.

Rugby union
A halfback and first five-eighth, Page represented  at a provincial level in two stints: in 1922 and 1923, and then in 1928 and 1929. He played just one match for the New Zealand national side, the All Blacks, against the touring New South Wales team at Lancaster Park in 1928. He did not appear in any rugby Test matches.

Death
Page died in Christchurch on 13 February 1987.

References

1902 births
1987 deaths
Cricketers from Christchurch
People educated at Christchurch Boys' High School
New Zealand rugby union players
New Zealand international rugby union players
Canterbury rugby union players
Rugby union scrum-halves
Rugby union fly-halves
Canterbury cricketers
New Zealand cricketers
New Zealand Test cricket captains
New Zealand Test cricketers
Pre-1930 New Zealand representative cricketers
International Cavaliers cricketers
Rugby union players from Christchurch
New Zealand Army cricketers
South Island Army cricketers